Mike Fraser may refer to:

 Mike Fraser (record producer), Canadian record producer, engineer, and mixer
 Mike Fraser (referee) (born 1980), New Zealand rugby union referee
 Mike Fraser (computer scientist) (born 1975), British computer scientist

See also 
 Michael Fraser (disambiguation)